Himalayacalamus is an  Asian genus of mountain clumping bamboo in the grass family. Species members are found growing at lower altitudes of the Himalaya in Bhutan, Tibet, India, and Nepal.

The genus is often confused with Drepanostachyum. Drepanostachyum, however, has many equal branches, Himalayacalamus species have one dominant branch.

Species

References

Bambusoideae
Bambusoideae genera